Polycoccum is a genus of lichenicolous fungi in the family Polycoccaceae. It has about 60 species.

Species
Polycoccum acarosporicola 
Polycoccum aksoyi 
Polycoccum alboatrum 
Polycoccum amygdalariae 
Polycoccum anatolicum 
Polycoccum atrostriatae 
Polycoccum clauderouxii 
Polycoccum crassum 
Polycoccum crespoae 
Polycoccum deformans 
Polycoccum dictyonematis 
Polycoccum dzieduszyckii 
Polycoccum epizoharyi 
Polycoccum follmannii 
Polycoccum heterodermiae 
Polycoccum hymeniicola 
Polycoccum ibericum 
Polycoccum islandicum 
Polycoccum kerneri 
Polycoccum laursenii 
Polycoccum longisporum 
Polycoccum marmoratum 
Polycoccum microcarpum 
Polycoccum microsticticum 
Polycoccum nigrosporum 
Polycoccum ochvarianum 
Polycoccum opulentum 
Polycoccum perrugosae  – host=Placopsis perrugosa
Polycoccum psorae 
Polycoccum psoromatis 
Polycoccum pulvinatum 
Polycoccum rinodinae 
Polycoccum rubellianae  – Spain; host=Caloplaca rubelliana
Polycoccum sporastatiae 
Polycoccum squamarioides 
Polycoccum stellulatae 
Polycoccum stictaria 
Polycoccum teresum 
Polycoccum trypethelioides 
Polycoccum ventosicola 
Polycoccum vermicularium

References

Trypetheliales
Dothideomycetes genera
Lichenicolous fungi
Taxa described in 1865
Taxa named by Gustav Wilhelm Körber